These are the official results of the Women's long jump event at the 1990 European Championships in Split, Yugoslavia, held at Stadion Poljud on 27 and 28 August 1990. There were 17 participating athletes.

Medalists

Results

Final
28 August

Qualification
27 August

Group A

Group B

Participation
According to an unofficial count, 17 athletes from 12 countries participated in the event.

 (1)
 (1)
 (1)
 (2)
 (1)
 (1)
 (1)
 (1)
 (3)
 (2)
 (1)
 (2)

See also
 1988 Women's Olympic Long Jump (Seoul)
 1991 Women's World Championships Long Jump (Tokyo)
 1992 Women's Olympic Long Jump (Barcelona)
 1994 Women's European Championships Long Jump (Helsinki)

References

 Results

Long jump
Long jump at the European Athletics Championships
1990 in women's athletics